Alexandrovsky (masculine), Alexandrovskaya (feminine), or Alexandrovskoye (neuter) is the name of several rural localities in Russia.

Modern inhabited localities

Altai Krai
As of 2010, one rural locality in Altai Krai bears this name:
Alexandrovsky, Altai Krai, a settlement in Alexandrovsky Selsoviet of Aleysky District

Arkhangelsk Oblast
As of 2010, two rural localities in Arkhangelsk Oblast bear this name:
Alexandrovskaya, Kholmogorsky District, Arkhangelsk Oblast, a village in Koydokursky Selsoviet of Kholmogorsky District
Alexandrovskaya, Velsky District, Arkhangelsk Oblast, a village in Shadrengsky Selsoviet of Velsky District

Republic of Bashkortostan
As of 2010, one rural locality in the Republic of Bashkortostan bears this name:
Alexandrovsky, Republic of Bashkortostan, a khutor in Krivle-Ilyushkinsky Selsoviet of Kuyurgazinsky District

Belgorod Oblast
As of 2010, two rural localities in Belgorod Oblast bear this name:
Alexandrovsky, Gubkinsky District, Belgorod Oblast, a khutor in Gubkinsky District
Alexandrovsky, Shebekinsky District, Belgorod Oblast, a khutor in Shebekinsky District

Bryansk Oblast
As of 2010, four rural localities in Bryansk Oblast bear this name:
Alexandrovsky, Sevsky District, Bryansk Oblast, a settlement in Nekislitsky Selsoviet of Sevsky District
Alexandrovsky, Kamensky Selsoviet, Surazhsky District, Bryansk Oblast, a settlement in Kamensky Selsoviet of Surazhsky District
Alexandrovsky, Novodrokovsky Selsoviet, Surazhsky District, Bryansk Oblast, a settlement in Novodrokovsky Selsoviet of Surazhsky District
Alexandrovskoye, Bryansk Oblast, a selo in Dubrovsky Selsoviet of Brasovsky District

Chelyabinsk Oblast
As of 2010, two rural localities in Chelyabinsk Oblast bear this name:
Alexandrovsky, Kizilsky District, Chelyabinsk Oblast, a settlement in Izmaylovsky Selsoviet of Kizilsky District
Alexandrovsky, Verkhneuralsky District, Chelyabinsk Oblast, a settlement in Karagaysky Selsoviet of Verkhneuralsky District

Chuvash Republic
As of 2010, one rural locality in the Chuvash Republic bears this name:
Alexandrovskoye, Chuvash Republic, a selo in Alexandrovskoye Rural Settlement of Morgaushsky District

Irkutsk Oblast
As of 2010, one rural locality in Irkutsk Oblast bears this name:
Alexandrovskoye, Irkutsk Oblast, a selo in Bokhansky District

Kabardino-Balkar Republic
As of 2010, two rural localities in the Kabardino-Balkar Republic bear this name:
Alexandrovsky, Kabardino-Balkar Republic, a khutor in Prokhladnensky District
Alexandrovskaya, Kabardino-Balkar Republic, a stanitsa in Maysky District

Kirov Oblast
As of 2010, six rural localities in Kirov Oblast bear this name:
Alexandrovsky, Nolinsky District, Kirov Oblast, a pochinok in Ryabinovsky Rural Okrug of Nolinsky District
Alexandrovsky (pochinok), Sanchursky District, Kirov Oblast, a pochinok in Smetaninsky Rural Okrug of Sanchursky District
Alexandrovsky (vyselok), Sanchursky District, Kirov Oblast, a vyselok in Smetaninsky Rural Okrug of Sanchursky District
Alexandrovsky, Urzhumsky District, Kirov Oblast, a pochinok in Buysky Rural Okrug of Urzhumsky District
Alexandrovskoye, Darovskoy District, Kirov Oblast, a selo in Verkhovondansky Rural Okrug of Darovskoy District
Alexandrovskoye, Kotelnichsky District, Kirov Oblast, a selo in Alexandrovsky Rural Okrug of Kotelnichsky District

Kostroma Oblast
As of 2010, one rural locality in Kostroma Oblast bears this name:
Alexandrovskoye, Kostroma Oblast, a settlement in Alexandrovskoye Settlement of Ostrovsky District

Krasnodar Krai
As of 2010, three rural localities in Krasnodar Krai bear this name:
Alexandrovsky, Seversky District, Krasnodar Krai, a khutor in Mikhaylovsky Rural Okrug of Seversky District
Alexandrovsky, Ust-Labinsky District, Krasnodar Krai, a khutor in Alexandrovsky Rural Okrug of Ust-Labinsky District
Alexandrovskaya, Krasnodar Krai, a stanitsa in Krasnogvardeysky Rural Okrug of Kanevskoy District

Kursk Oblast
As of 2010, three rural localities in Kursk Oblast bear this name:
Alexandrovsky, Fatezhsky District, Kursk Oblast, a khutor in Kolychevsky Selsoviet of Fatezhsky District
Alexandrovsky, Kastorensky District, Kursk Oblast, a settlement in Alexeyevsky Selsoviet of Kastorensky District
Alexandrovsky, Kurchatovsky District, Kursk Oblast, a khutor in Dronyayevsky Selsoviet of Kurchatovsky District

Mari El Republic
As of 2010, one rural locality in the Mari El Republic bears this name:
Alexandrovsky, Mari El Republic, a village in Mari-Bilyamorsky Rural Okrug of Mari-Tureksky District

Moscow Oblast
As of 2010, one rural locality in Moscow Oblast bears this name:
Alexandrovskoye, Moscow Oblast, a village in Yaropoletskoye Rural Settlement of Volokolamsky District

Nizhny Novgorod Oblast
As of 2010, one rural locality in Nizhny Novgorod Oblast bears this name:
Alexandrovsky, Nizhny Novgorod Oblast, a settlement in Kerzhemoksky Selsoviet of Shatkovsky District

Novgorod Oblast
As of 2010, one rural locality in Novgorod Oblast bears this name:
Alexandrovskoye, Novgorod Oblast, a village in Novoselitskoye Settlement of Novgorodsky District

Novosibirsk Oblast
As of 2010, four rural localities in Novosibirsk Oblast bear this name:
Alexandrovsky, Chulymsky District, Novosibirsk Oblast, a settlement in Chulymsky District
Alexandrovsky, Iskitimsky District, Novosibirsk Oblast, a settlement in Iskitimsky District
Alexandrovsky, Karasuksky District, Novosibirsk Oblast, a settlement in Karasuksky District
Alexandrovsky, Kochenyovsky District, Novosibirsk Oblast, a settlement in Kochenyovsky District

Omsk Oblast
As of 2010, one rural locality in Omsk Oblast bears this name:
Alexandrovskoye, Omsk Oblast, a selo in Alexandrovsky Rural Okrug of Sherbakulsky District

Oryol Oblast
As of 2010, five rural localities in Oryol Oblast bear this name:
Alexandrovsky, Druzhensky Selsoviet, Dmitrovsky District, Oryol Oblast, a settlement in Druzhensky Selsoviet of Dmitrovsky District
Alexandrovsky, Solominsky Selsoviet, Dmitrovsky District, Oryol Oblast, a settlement in Solominsky Selsoviet of Dmitrovsky District
Alexandrovsky, Kromskoy District, Oryol Oblast, a khutor in Krivchikovsky Selsoviet of Kromskoy District
Alexandrovsky, Orlovsky District, Oryol Oblast, a settlement in Zhilyayevsky Selsoviet of Orlovsky District
Alexandrovsky, Trosnyansky District, Oryol Oblast, a settlement in Muravlsky Selsoviet of Trosnyansky District

Rostov Oblast
As of 2010, three rural localities in Rostov Oblast bear this name:
Alexandrovsky, Millerovsky District, Rostov Oblast, a khutor in Trenevskoye Rural Settlement of Millerovsky District
Alexandrovsky, Oblivsky District, Rostov Oblast, a khutor in Alexandrovskoye Rural Settlement of Oblivsky District
Alexandrovsky, Salsky District, Rostov Oblast, a khutor in Ivanovskoye Rural Settlement of Salsky District

Saint Petersburg
As of 2010, one urban locality in Saint Petersburg bears this name:
Alexandrovskaya, Saint Petersburg, a municipal settlement in Pushkinsky District

Saratov Oblast
As of 2010, one rural locality in Saratov Oblast bears this name:
Alexandrovsky, Saratov Oblast, a settlement in Balashovsky District

Smolensk Oblast
As of 2010, two rural localities in Smolensk Oblast bear this name:
Alexandrovskoye, Monastyrshchinsky District, Smolensk Oblast, a village in Sobolevskoye Rural Settlement of Monastyrshchinsky District
Alexandrovskoye, Novoduginsky District, Smolensk Oblast, a village in Izvekovskoye Rural Settlement of Novoduginsky District

Stavropol Krai
As of 2010, one rural locality in Stavropol Krai bears this name:
Alexandrovskoye, Stavropol Krai, a selo in Alexandrovsky Selsoviet of Alexandrovsky District

Sverdlovsk Oblast
As of 2010, two rural localities in Sverdlovsk Oblast bear this name:
Alexandrovskoye, Sverdlovsk Oblast, a selo in Krasnoufimsky District
Alexandrovskaya, Sverdlovsk Oblast, a village in Taborinsky District

Republic of Tatarstan
As of 2010, one rural locality in the Republic of Tatarstan bears this name:
Alexandrovsky, Republic of Tatarstan, a settlement in Laishevsky District

Tomsk Oblast
As of 2010, two rural localities in Tomsk Oblast bear this name:
Alexandrovskoye, Alexandrovsky District, Tomsk Oblast, a selo in Alexandrovsky District
Alexandrovskoye, Tomsky District, Tomsk Oblast, a selo in Tomsky District

Tver Oblast
As of 2010, three rural localities in Tver Oblast bear this name:
Alexandrovsky, Tver Oblast, a khutor in Starosandovskoye Rural Settlement of Sandovsky District
Alexandrovskoye, Sandovsky District, Tver Oblast, a village in Bolshemalinskoye Rural Settlement of Sandovsky District
Alexandrovskoye, Zapadnodvinsky District, Tver Oblast, a village in Zapadnodvinskoye Rural Settlement of Zapadnodvinsky District

Vologda Oblast
As of 2010, five rural localities in Vologda Oblast bear this name:
Alexandrovskoye, Vologodsky District, Vologda Oblast, a village in Raboche-Krestyansky Selsoviet of Vologodsky District
Alexandrovskoye, Vytegorsky District, Vologda Oblast, a selo in Annensky Selsoviet of Vytegorsky District
Alexandrovskaya, Borisovsky Selsoviet, Babayevsky District, Vologda Oblast, a village in Borisovsky Selsoviet of Babayevsky District
Alexandrovskaya, Volkovsky Selsoviet, Babayevsky District, Vologda Oblast, a village in Volkovsky Selsoviet of Babayevsky District
Alexandrovskaya, Tarnogsky District, Vologda Oblast, a village in Verkhnekokshengsky Selsoviet of Tarnogsky District

Yaroslavl Oblast
As of 2010, two rural localities in Yaroslavl Oblast bear this name:
Alexandrovskoye, Poshekhonsky District, Yaroslavl Oblast, a village in Beloselsky Rural Okrug of Poshekhonsky District
Alexandrovskoye, Tutayevsky District, Yaroslavl Oblast, a village in Rodionovsky Rural Okrug of Tutayevsky District

Historical localities
Alexandrovskoye, a village in what now is Amur Oblast, one of the predecessors of the town of Belogorsk

Renamed localities
Alexandrovsky, former name of Alexandrovsk-Sakhalinsky from 1881 to 1926
Alexandrovskaya, former name of Alexandrovsk-Sakhalinsky from 1862 to 1881